Willy Rumpf (4 April 1903 – 8 February 1982) was a German  communist politician and Finance Minister in the German Democratic Republic.

Rumpf was born in Berlin. During 1917–1920, he was educated as an insurance assessor, and worked until 1932 as an accountant, cashier and a foreign trade correspondent. In 1920 he joined the German Communist Youth Association, and in 1925 the Communist Party of Germany. From 1933 to 1938,  he was arrested in  penitentiary  and detained at the Sachsenhausen concentration camp. After that he returned to work, and was a member of the resistance group Robert Uhrig. During 1944–1945, he was again in custody.

From 1945 to 1947 he was deputy leader of the finance department of the magistrate of greater Berlin, from 1947 to 1948 leader of the trust administration of Berlin, from 1948 to 1949 leader of the central administration for finances of the German Economic Commission.

In 1946. Rumpf became a member of the Socialist Unity Party of Germany (SED). During  1949–1967, he was a delegate of the Volkskammer, from 1950 as a candidate and from 1963 as a member of the central committee of the SED. He was from 1955 to 1966 Finance Minister and member of the cabinet council, and from 1963 its president.

Rumpf received the Order of Merit for the Fatherland in 1958, in 1963 the Order of Karl Marx, and in 1978 the Star of Friendship of Nations.

References

1903 births
1982 deaths
Politicians from Berlin
Communist Party of Germany politicians
Members of the Central Committee of the Socialist Unity Party of Germany
Finance ministers of East Germany
Government ministers of East Germany
Members of the Provisional Volkskammer
Members of the 1st Volkskammer
Members of the 2nd Volkskammer
Members of the 3rd Volkskammer
Members of the 4th Volkskammer
Communists in the German Resistance
Sachsenhausen concentration camp survivors
Recipients of the Patriotic Order of Merit (honor clasp)
Recipients of the Banner of Labor